Brasil Global Tour, officially with sponsorship the Chevrolet Brasil Global Tour, is a package of all the friendlies of the Brazil National Team from October 2012 until the 2022 World Cup in Qatar.  The CBF has used the fact that Brazil is one of the most sought after teams in the world to market itself and Brazil's friendly games on the international stage.  The contract between CBF and Pitch International, the company that operates the tour, started in October 2012, and runs through the 2022 FIFA World Cup.  Due to the fact that Brazil was the host of the 2014 FIFA World Cup, they had no qualification games for the tournament as they automatically qualified as the hosts.  This led to them only playing friendly games for the first few years of the contract, making the proposition more valuable to Pitch International.

History
The CBF has used the fact that Brazil is one of the most sought after teams in the world to market itself and Brazil's friendly games on the international stage.  The contract between CBF and Pitch International, the company that operates the tour, started in October 2012, and runs through the 2022 FIFA World Cup.  Brazil, being the host of the 2014 FIFA World Cup, had no qualification games for the tournament as they automatically qualified as the hosts.  This led to Brazil only playing friendly games for the first few years of the contract.

Pitch International was appointed in August 2012 with the first game to begin in October of the same year. The deal saw Pitch International replace Kentaro, an agency which had previously organized a package of Brazil friendlies around the world before 2012.

CBF stated that before working with Pitch International, it was having trouble making money off of its home friendly games, despite Brazil's relatively big status in the game.  The deal with Pitch International sees the CBF paid a fee of approximately $1 million a game and Pitch International typical receives a match fee of in between $2–3 million per game.

To date there have been 54 games against various opponents on all 6 inhabited continents. Brazil has played once in Africa, 7 times in Asia, 2 times in Oceania, 19 times in Europe, 13 times in North America, and 12 times in South America.

Games

References

History of the Brazil national football team
2010s in Brazilian sport